María José Granatto  (born 21 April 1995) is an Argentine field hockey player who plays as a forward for Argentine club Club Santa Barbara and the Argentina national team. She is the younger sister of Argentina's hockey player and teammate Victoria Granatto.

She was part of the Argentine team at the 2016 Summer Olympics in Rio de Janeiro and won the silver medal at the 2020 Summer Olympics.

Career 
She won a gold medal at the 2019 Pan American Games. On club level she plays for Club Santa Bárbara in Argentina. At the 2016 and 2017 Hockey Stars Awards she won the FIH Rising Star of the Year.

She was part of the national squad that won the 2022 Pan American Cup, being elected as the best player of the tournament.

References

External links
 

1995 births
Living people
Las Leonas players
Olympic field hockey players of Argentina
Argentine people of Italian descent
Argentine female field hockey players
Field hockey players at the 2016 Summer Olympics
Field hockey players at the 2020 Summer Olympics
Sportspeople from La Plata
Female field hockey forwards
Expatriate field hockey players
Argentine expatriate sportspeople in the Netherlands
HC Oranje-Rood players
Field hockey players at the 2019 Pan American Games
Pan American Games medalists in field hockey
Pan American Games gold medalists for Argentina
Medalists at the 2019 Pan American Games
Olympic silver medalists for Argentina
Medalists at the 2020 Summer Olympics
Olympic medalists in field hockey
21st-century Argentine women